James Hawkinson is an American cinematographer known for his work in television, music videos, and film. He is best known for his critically acclaimed work on the Hannibal and The Man in the High Castle television series', for which he has received numerous accolades including a Primetime Emmy Award and a nomination for an ASC Award.

Life and career 
Hawkinson began his career as an electrician, lighting technician, and gaffer at Boss Film Studios, a prominent visual effects company. He worked on numerous big-budget, effects-heavy films like Alien 3, Species, and Air Force One, and lower-budget genre films like Intruder and Fist of the North Star. Starting in 1997, he became a highly prolific DP for music videos, with over 200 credits to his name.

Hawkinson served as director of photography on the sitcom Arrested Development for which he experimented with different 16 mm film cameras and HD camcorders in order to achieve the look and visual styles desired by the series' creators Joe and Anthony Russo. He worked on several subsequent television projects with the Russos, including Carpoolers, The Increasingly Poor Decisions of Todd Margaret, and Community. He shot the horror film The Unborn and the 2007 remake of The Hitcher, both of which were produced by Platinum Dunes.

Starting in 2013, Hawkinson served as the series DP on Hannibal, a psychological thriller -drama series based on the novels by Thomas Harris. His photography heavily utilizing angular lighting and shallow focus to create a distinct, unnerving atmosphere. His work was a point of near-universal acclaim, many praising its dark, brooding, art-house style and disturbing atmosphere, with many calling it the best-looking show on television.

His work on the first season of the dystopian science fiction series The Man in the High Castle earned him a Primetime Emmy Award for Outstanding Cinematography for a Single-Camera Series and a nomination for an ASC Award.

Filmography

Television

Film

Music videos

Video album

Awards and nominations 
 Nominated:
 2001 MTV Video Music Award for Best Cinematography – Get Ur Freak On
 2016 ASC Award Outstanding Achievement in Cinematography in Television Movie/Mini-Series/Pilot – The Man in the High Castle
 2017 Primetime Emmy Award for Outstanding Cinematography for a Single-Camera Series – The Man in the High Castle
 Won:
 2016 Primetime Emmy Award for Outstanding Cinematography for a Single-Camera Series – The Man in the High Castle

References 

American cinematographers
Living people
Year of birth missing (living people)